Jadval-e Ghureh-ye Mehrian (also Romanized as Jadval-e Ghūreh-ye Mehrīān; also known as Jadval Ghūreh) is a village in Sarrud-e Shomali Rural District, in the Central District of Boyer-Ahmad County, Kohgiluyeh and Boyer-Ahmad Province, Iran. At the 2006 census, its population was 216, in 48 families.

References 

Populated places in Boyer-Ahmad County